Tri-County Airport  is a public use airport located nine nautical miles (10 mi, 17 km) west of the central business district of Ahoskie, in Hertford County, North Carolina, United States. It is owned by the Tri-County Airport Authority. This airport is included in the National Plan of Integrated Airport Systems for 2011–2015, which categorized it as a general aviation facility.

Although most U.S. airports use the same three-letter location identifier for the FAA and IATA, this airport is assigned ASJ by the FAA but has no assignment from the IATA (which assigned ASJ to Amami Oshima Airport in Amami Ōshima, Japan). The airport's ICAO identifier is KASJ.

Facilities and aircraft 
Tri-County Airport covers an area of 250 acres (101 ha) at an elevation of 68 feet (21 m) above mean sea level. It has one runway designated 1/19 with an asphalt surface measuring 4,502 by 75 feet (1,372 x 23 m).

For the 12-month period ending August 18, 2009, the airport had 13,100 aircraft operations, an average of 35 per day: 98% general aviation, 2% air taxi, and <1% military. At that time there were 9 aircraft based at this airport: 89% single-engine and 11% jet.

References

External links 
  at North Carolina DOT airport guide
 Aerial image as of March 1993 from USGS The National Map
 

Airports in North Carolina
Transportation in Hertford County, North Carolina
Buildings and structures in Hertford County, North Carolina